David Benjamin Krynzel (born November 7, 1981) is a former Major League Baseball outfielder. He made his major league debut on September 1, .

Krynzel was drafted in the 1st round (11th overall) of the 2000 Major League Baseball Draft and spent seven years in the Milwaukee Brewers farm system before being traded to the Arizona Diamondbacks on November 25, with Doug Davis and Dana Eveland for Johnny Estrada, Greg Aquino, and Claudio Vargas. On April 8, the Diamondbacks released him. He signed a minor league contract with the Baltimore Orioles in December 2008.

External links

Dave Krynzel Minor League Splits and Situational Stats

1981 births
Living people
Baseball players from Dayton, Ohio
Major League Baseball outfielders
Milwaukee Brewers players
Indianapolis Indians players
Nashville Sounds players
Tucson Sidewinders players
Arizona League Brewers players
High Desert Mavericks players
Green Valley High School (Nevada) alumni